Fisher Koala may refer to :
Fisher FP-202 Koala, a Canadian ultralight aircraft design
Fisher Super Koala, a Canadian ultralight aircraft design